Charles Grabau is a Middlesex, Massachusetts Superior Court Judge.

He is most noted for ruling over the case of Thomas Junta in 2002, as well as several high-profile priest abuse scandals including Robert Gale and Paul R. Shanley.

See also
List of Hispanic/Latino American jurists
List of first minority male lawyers and judges in Massachusetts

References

American jurists
Living people
Year of birth missing (living people)
Hispanic and Latino American judges